Jeanne Rowe Skinner (1917-1988) was an American Navy officer and former First Lady of Guam.

Early life 
On April 1, 1917, Skinner was born as Jeanne Dorothy Rowe in Marshalltown, Iowa. Skinner's father was George Lewis Rowe (1889-1975). Skinner's mother was Marie Henrietta (nee Franz) Rowe (1892-1977). Skinner had one sister, Virginia Robertson Rowe (1913-2009). In 1940, Skinner lived with her parents in Lancaster, Nebraska.

Education 
Skinner earned a degree from University of Nebraska. Skinner was a member of Kappa Kappa Gamma sorority and a member of Pi Lambda Theta honorary society.

Career 
Skinner served as an officer (ensign and lieutenant) in Women Accepted for Volunteer Emergency Service (WAVES), a woman's branch of the United States Navy Reserve. Skinner worked in the Public Relations division of the U.S. Navy Department in Washington, D.C. and in New York.

In 1949, when Carlton Skinner was appointed by President Harry S. Truman as the Governor of Guam, Skinner became the First Lady of Guam on September 17, 1949, until April 22, 1953.

Personal life 
On May 1, 1943, Skinner married Carlton Skinner at the home of Mr. & Mrs. Harvison Catlin Holland, her sister and brother-in-law, in Dayton, Ohio. They had three children, Franz, Andrea, and Barbara. They also had a Dalmatian named Lilu’okalani. 

In 1943, Skinner and her husband lived in an apartment on Twentieth Street in Washington D.C. In 1949, Skinner and her family moved Guam. In the 1950s to 1960s, Skinner lived in Belvedere, California.

After Skinner's divorce, in 1967, her ex-husband married Solange Petit, a French anthropologist.

Skinner died on April 19, 1988, at the Veteran Medical Center in Palo Alto, California; she is interred at Golden Gate National Cemetery in San Bruno, California.

See also 
 Margaret Chung, a member of Navy's Women's Advisory Council which pushed Public Law 689

References

External links 
 Carlton Skinner Here Next Week En Route to Guam Governorship
 Newspaper of Evening Star, May 2, 1943, Page 52
 80-G-43425: Ensign Jeanne R. Skinner, USNR, October 1943 at navy.mil

1917 births
1988 deaths
Guamanian women in politics
Female United States Navy officers
First Ladies and Gentlemen of Guam
People from Marshalltown, Iowa
People from Palo Alto, California
University of Nebraska alumni
WAVES personnel
Military personnel from California
Military personnel from Iowa